Ádám Kónya (born 19 December 1992) is a Hungarian cross-country skier. He competed in the 2018 Winter Olympics.

References

External links
 

1992 births
People from Veszprém
Living people
Cross-country skiers at the 2018 Winter Olympics
Cross-country skiers at the 2022 Winter Olympics
Hungarian male cross-country skiers
Olympic cross-country skiers of Hungary
Sportspeople from Veszprém County
21st-century Hungarian people